Saint Flavian may refer to:

 Flavian (died 259, one of the Martyrs of Carthage under Valerian
 Flavianus of Avellino (died 311), a priest from Antioch martyred with St Florentinus
 Flavian of Constantinople  (died 449), patriarch
 Fravitta of Constantinople, better known as Fravitta (died 490), patriarch
 Flavianus Michael Malke (1858–1915), Syrian Catholic eparch of Cizre martyred during a Turkish massacre of Christians